Valerie Curtin is an American actress and screenwriter.

Personal life
Curtin was born in Jackson Heights, New York, the daughter of radio actor Joseph Curtin. She attended Lake Erie College. 

She is a cousin of TV comedian/actress Jane Curtin. She was married to writer and director Barry Levinson from 1975–1982.

Career
Curtin performed with comedy groups and acted in theatrical productions in New York before going to Los Angeles in 1971. There, she was a member of The Committee, a comedy group.

Curtin began her writing career in the 1970s working on episodes of the television sitcom The Mary Tyler Moore Show. Curtin and her then husband Barry Levinson were nominated for an Academy Award (in the category of Best Writing, Screenplay Written Directly for the Screen) for ...And Justice for All (1979) starring Al Pacino. They also co-wrote the semi-autobiographical Best Friends (1982), which starred Burt Reynolds and Goldie Hawn.

Curtin's acting career has run concurrently with her writing career. During the 1970s, she made various guest appearances on television in shows such as Happy Days, Welcome Back, Kotter, Rhoda, The Rockford Files, and Barney Miller. In March 1976, ABC shot the pilot episode for Three's Company, in which Curtin appeared alongside John Ritter and Susanne Zenor. Curtin played a character named Jenny, who eventually became Janet Wood, played by Joyce DeWitt.

Her movie appearances include Alice Doesn't Live Here Anymore (her first movie appearance, 1974), All the President's Men, Silver Streak, and Silent Movie (all 1976), Why Would I Lie? (1980), as well as Maxie (1985) and John Cassavetes' final film, the 1986 comedy Big Trouble, plus a small, uncredited role in Best Friends.

In 1982, Curtin was given the role of Judy Bernly in the television sitcom 9 to 5 based on the 1980 movie of the same name. Her TV role was portrayed by Jane Fonda in the film version. Curtin was dropped from the show after two seasons, when James Komack came on as the new executive producer, replacing the team led by Jane Fonda. However, Curtin returned for a syndicated version of 9 to 5 (1986–1988), reprising her earlier role; the new version was successful. In the 1980s and 1990s, her writing credits included mainstream films such as Inside Moves (1980), the 1984 remake of Unfaithfully Yours, and Toys (1992).

Curtin has also guest-starred in shows such as Frasier, Party of Five, Becker, The District, Just Shoot Me, and ER.

Selected filmography

References

External links
 

Living people
American film actresses
American stage actresses
American television actresses
Actresses from New York City
20th-century American actresses
American women screenwriters
21st-century American actresses
Screenwriters from New York (state)
Year of birth missing (living people)